Aargau Jura Park (Jurapark Aargau) is located north of Aarau, between the rivers Aare and Rhine, in the Swiss canton of Aargau. It straddles the border between Jura and Basel. The park is mainly located on the Jurassic Plateau, between Frick and Villigen, and also encompasses the Aargau Jura mountains and valleys. The northern area includes sparse pine forests, fruit orchards, rocky steppes, dry meadows and terraced vineyards, while the southern region fosters forests and wildlife. It was declared a regional nature park of national importance in 2012 by the Federal Office for the Environment.

The villages Herznach and Wölfinswil traditionally mined ore in the park and thus, left many studs. A mining tunnel was excavated and made accessible to visitors.

See also 
 Nature parks in Switzerland

References

External links 
 

Biosphere reserves of Switzerland
Geography of the canton of Solothurn
Geography of Aargau
Protected areas of Switzerland
Tourist attractions in Aargau
Tourist attractions in the canton of Solothurn